Sammanam may refer to:

Sammanam (1975 film), a Malayalam film released in 1975 starring Prem Nazir and Jayabharathi
Sammanam (1997 film), a Malayalam film released in 1997 starring Manoj K. Jayan and Manju Warrier